The 2019 FC Shakhter Karagandy season was the 29th successive season that the club will play in the Kazakhstan Premier League, the highest tier of association football in Kazakhstan. Shakhter finished the season in 9th position whilst they were knocked out of the Kazakhstan Cup at the last 16 stage by FC Taraz.

Season events
On 20 June, Shakhter Karagandy extended their contract with Donjet Shkodra until the end of the 2020 season.

On 26 June, Lukáš Droppa left Shakhter Karagandy.

On 9 July, Shakhter announced the signing of Reginaldo from Kukësi.

Squad

Transfers

In

Loans In

Released

Competitions

Premier League

Results summary

Results by round

Results

League table

Kazakhstan Cup

Squad statistics

Appearances and goals

|-
|colspan="14"|Players away from Shakhter Karagandy on loan:
|-
|colspan="14"|Players who left Shakhter Karagandy during the season:

|}

Goal scorers

Disciplinary record

References

External links
Official Website

FC Shakhter Karagandy seasons
Shakhter Karagandy